Space and First Takes is the sixth album by Lee Michaels and was released in 1972.  It reached #78 on the Billboard Top LPs chart.  It was the follow-up album to his most successful album, 5th which featured the #6 hit single "Do You Know What I Mean".  The album consists of two shorter songs and two extended tracks.

The album featured the single "Hold on to Freedom" which did not chart on Billboard, but reached 104 on Cashbox.

Track listing
All songs written by Lee Michaels except where noted.
 "Own Special Way (As Long As)" (Joel Christie) – 4:33
 "First Names" – 13:36
 "Hold on to Freedom" (Johnny Otis) – 5:02
 "Space and First Takes" – 16:40

Personnel

Musicians
 Lee Michaels – lead vocals, organ, piano, guitar
 Drake Levin – guitar
 Joel Christie – bass
 Keith Knudsen – drums

Technical
 Lee Michaels – producer
 Richard Madrid – engineer
 Henry Lewy – mixing engineer
 Roland Young – art direction

Charts

References

1972 albums
Lee Michaels albums
A&M Records albums